The Treaty of Lyon was signed on January 17, 1601, between France and Savoy, to bring an end to the Franco-Savoyard War of 1600–1601. Based on the terms of the treaty, Henry IV of France relinquished Saluzzo to Savoy, while Savoy kept Pont de Gresin, Valserine, and was required to pay France 150,000 livres. In return, Henry acquired Bugey, Valromey, Gex, and Bresse.

Eventually, the territory of Bresse was attached to the French military government of Burgundy.

See also
List of treaties

References

Sources

External links
Saluzzo

Almanac - January 17
Encyclopædia Britannica - Bresse

1601 in France
1601 treaties
Lyon (1601)
Treaties of the Duchy of Savoy
History of Lyon